The Liechtenstein Museum is a private art museum in Vienna, Austria. It contains much of the art collection of its owners, the Princely Family of Liechtenstein, rulers of the principality of Liechtenstein. It includes important European works of art, forming one of the world's leading private art collections. Its highlight used to be Leonardo da Vinci's portrait of Ginevra de' Benci, which was acquired in 1967 by the National Gallery of Art in Washington, D.C. 

The museum, which was originally open to the public from the early 19th century until the Anschluss of 1938, had various locations, including the Liechtenstein Garden Palace (Gartenpalais) at Fürstengasse 1 in Vienna's 9th District (Alsergrund), and the Liechtenstein City Palace (Stadtpalais) at Bankgasse 9 in Vienna's 1st District (Innere Stadt). The museum was reopened on 29 March 2004 in the Garden Palace, but after battling with low visitor numbers, it was closed for regular visiting by the public in November 2011. According to the official website of the Garden Palace, "the highlights of the princely collections can be viewed exclusively as part of an event package or a pre-booked guided tour".

Objects from the collection have been sent on touring exhibitions to museums in other countries, especially the United States.  In particular, displays are regularly mounted at the Kunstmuseum Liechtenstein in Vaduz, which is otherwise a gallery for a modern art collection donated to the principality of Liechtenstein by the ruling family. Other works from the collection fill the palaces and residences of the Princely Family in Liechtenstein and Austria.

A catalogue of the artists (with short biographies) featured in the gallery at the time of Prince Joseph Wenzel was compiled by Vicenzo Fanti in 1767.<ref>[https://books.google.com/books?id=nK4DAAAAYAAJ&pg=PA13&dq=Pittore&hl=en&sa=X&ei=Hvy7UNA2hbfLAfXfgEg&ved=0CC0Q6AEwADgo#v=onepage&q=Pittore&f=false|Compendio delle vite de Pittori, Scultori, e d'altri Artefici le di cui famose opere formano la prescrita celebre galleria di sua altezza Giuseppe Wenceslao Principe Regnate della Casa di Lichtenstein]</ref>

 Liechtenstein Garden Palace 

The Gartenpalais was built by Prince Johann Adam Andreas von Liechtenstein, who commissioned its design and construction from Domenico Egidio Rossi; the shell was finished in 1700. Painted décor in the Gartenpalais'' was contributed by Marcantonio Franceschini, Antonio Bellucci, Andrea Pozzo and Johann Michael Rottmayr. Sculpture came from Giovanni Giuliani and his studio, and stucco from the stuccator Santino Bussi.

Artworks (selection)

Notes

External links 

Liechtenstein Garden Palace webpage
Firearms from the collections of the Prince of Liechtenstein, an exhibition catalog from The Metropolitan Museum of Art (fully available online as PDF), which contains material from the Liechtenstein Museum
Peter Paul Rubens: the Decius Mus cycle, an exhibition catalog from The Metropolitan Museum of Art (fully available online as PDF), which focuses on this work from the Liechtenstein Museum

Buildings and structures in Alsergrund
Art museums and galleries in Vienna
Private collections in Liechtenstein
House of Liechtenstein
Austria–Switzerland relations
Historic house museums in Austria
Gardens in Austria
Liechtenstein art
Art museums established in 2004
2004 establishments in Austria

ru:Дворец Лихтенштейн